Baren may refer to:

 Baren (printing tool), a disk-like hand tool in Japanese woodblock printing
 The Bar (franchise), or Baren, a reality competition television franchise that originated in Sweden
 Baren (Danish TV series)
 Baren (Norwegian TV series)
 Baren (Swedish TV series)

People 
 Baren (author) (1901–1972), Chinese writer, critic, and translator
 Kees van Baaren (1906–1970), Dutch composer and teacher
  (1882-1952), Dutch politician; see Timeline of Delft

Places 
 Baren, Haute-Garonne, France

Xinjiang, China
 Baren, Payzawat County, a town in Payzawat County, Kashgar Prefecture
 Baren Township, Akto County, Kizilsu Kyrgyz Autonomous Prefecture
 Barin Township, Kargilik County, also Baren Township, a in Xinjiang
 Barin Township, Shule County, also Baren Township, a in Xinjiang

See also 
 Barin (disambiguation)